Archaeocidaris is an extinct genus of echinoid that lived from the Late Devonian to the Late Permian.  Its remains have been found in Africa, Europe, and North America.

Sources
 Fossils (Smithsonian Handbooks) by David Ward (Page 176)

External links
Archaeocidaris in the Paleobiology Database

Devonian echinoderms
Carboniferous echinoderms
Permian echinoderms
Paleozoic animals of Africa
Paleozoic echinoderms of Europe
Paleozoic echinoderms of North America
Prehistoric echinoid genera
Cidaroida genera
Late Devonian first appearances
Late Devonian animals
Lopingian genus extinctions